Major Frederick Victor Longstaff (15 June 1879 -  1961) was an Anglo-Canadian soldier, architect, military historian and mountaineer.  Son of Llewellyn W. Longstaff and brother of Tom Longstaff.  He wrote various works, including (1917) The Book of the Machine Gun with A. Hilliard Atteridge and Esquimalt Naval Base: A History of Its Work and Its Defences (1941).

References 

Canadian people of English descent
Canadian soldiers
20th-century Canadian architects
Canadian military historians
Canadian mountain climbers
1879 births
1961 deaths
British emigrants to Canada